Phoebe Sarah Hertha Ayrton (28 April 1854 – 26 August 1923) was a British engineer, mathematician, physicist and inventor, and suffragette. Known in adult life as Hertha Ayrton, born Phoebe Sarah Marks, she was awarded the Hughes Medal by the Royal Society for her work on electric arcs and ripple marks in sand and water.

Early life and education 
Hertha Ayrton was born Phoebe Sarah Marks in Portsea, Hampshire, England, on 28 April 1854. In her youth she went by the name Sarah. She was the third child of a Polish Jewish watchmaker named Levi Marks, an immigrant from Tsarist Poland; and Alice Theresa Moss, a seamstress, the daughter of Joseph Moss, a glass merchant of Portsea. Her father died in 1861, leaving Sarah's mother with seven children and an eighth expected. Sarah then took up some of the responsibility for caring for the younger children.

At the age of nine, Sarah was invited by her aunts, who ran a school in northwest London, to live with her cousins and be educated with them. She was known to her peers and teachers as a fiery, occasionally crude personality. Her cousins introduced Ayrton to science and mathematics. By age 16, she was working as a governess, but she had not renounced her ambitions.

George Eliot supported Ayrton's application to Girton College, Cambridge. There, Ayrton studied mathematics and was coached by physicist Richard Glazebrook. She also constructed a sphygmomanometer (blood pressure meter), led the choral society, founded the Girton fire brigade, and, together with Charlotte Scott, formed a mathematical club. In 1880, Ayrton passed the Mathematical Tripos, but Cambridge did not grant her an academic degree because at the time it did not award full degrees to women. Ayrton then passed an external examination at the University of London, which awarded her a Bachelor of Science degree in 1881.

Mathematics and electrical engineering work 
Upon her return to London, Ayrton earned money by teaching and embroidery, ran a club for working girls, and cared for her invalid sister. She also put her mathematical skills to practical use – she taught at Notting Hill and Ealing High School, and was also active in devising and solving mathematical problems, many of which were published in "Mathematical Questions and Their Solutions" from the Educational Times. In 1884 Ayrton patented a line-divider, an engineering drawing instrument for dividing a line into any number of equal parts and for enlarging and reducing figures. The line-divider was her first major invention and, while its primary use was likely for artists for enlarging and diminishing, it was also useful to architects and engineers. Ayrton's patent application was financially supported by Louisa Goldsmid and feminist Barbara Bodichon, who together advanced her enough money to take out patents; the invention was shown at the Exhibition of Women's Industries and received much press attention. Ayrton's 1884 patent was the first of many – from 1884 until her death, Hertha registered 26 patents: five on mathematical dividers, 13 on arc lamps and electrodes, the rest on the propulsion of air.

In 1884 Ayrton began attending evening classes on electricity at Finsbury Technical College, delivered by Professor William Edward Ayrton, a pioneer in electrical engineering and physics education and a fellow of the Royal Society. On 6 May 1885 she married her former teacher, and thereafter assisted him with experiments in physics and electricity. She also began her own investigation into the characteristics of the electric arc.

In the late nineteenth century, electric arc lighting was in wide use for public lighting. The tendency of electric arcs to flicker and hiss was a major problem.  In 1895, Hertha Ayrton wrote a series of articles for the Electrician, explaining that these phenomena were the result of oxygen coming into contact with the carbon rods used to create the arc. In 1899, she was the first woman ever to read her own paper before the Institution of Electrical Engineers (IEE). Her paper was entitled "The Hissing of the Electric Arc". Shortly thereafter, Ayrton was elected the first female member of the IEE; the next woman to be admitted to the IEE was Dorothy Smith in 1958. She petitioned to present a paper before the Royal Society but was not allowed because of her sex and "The Mechanism of the Electric Arc" was read by John Perry in her stead in 1901. Ayrton was also the first woman to win a prize from the Society, the Hughes Medal, awarded to her in 1906 in honour of her research on the motion of ripples in sand and water and her work on the electric arc. By the late nineteenth century, Ayrton's work in the field of electrical engineering was recognised more widely, domestically and internationally. At the International Congress of Women held in London in 1899, she presided over the physical science section. Ayrton also spoke at the International Electrical Congress in Paris in 1900. Her success there led the British Association for the Advancement of Science to allow women to serve on general and sectional committees.

In 1902, Ayrton published The Electric Arc, a summary of her research and work on the electric arc, with origins in her earlier articles from the Electrician published between 1895 and 1896. With this publication, her contribution to the field of electrical engineering began to be cemented. However, initially at least, Ayrton was not well received by the more prestigious and traditional scientific societies such as the Royal Society. In the aftermath of the publication of The Electric Arc, Ayrton was proposed as a Fellow of the Royal Society by renowned electrical engineer John Perry in 1902. Her application was turned down by the Council of the Royal Society, who decreed that married women were not eligible to be Fellows. However, in 1904, she became the first woman to read a paper before the Royal Society when she was allowed to read her paper "The Origin and Growth of Ripple Marks" and this was later published in the Proceedings of the Royal Society. In 1906, she was awarded the Royal Society's prestigious Hughes Medal "for her experimental investigations on the electric arc, and also on sand ripples." She was the fifth recipient of this prize, awarded annually since 1902, in recognition of an original discovery in the physical sciences, particularly electricity and magnetism or their applications, and as of 2018, one of only two women so honoured, the other being Michele Dougherty in 2008.

Support for women's suffrage 
As a teenager, Ayrton became deeply involved in the women's suffrage movement, joining the WSPU in 1907 after attending a celebration with released prisoners.  In 1909 Ayrton opened the second day of the Knightsbridge "Women's Exhibition and Sale of Work in the Colours" which included new model bicycles painted in purple, white and green and raised from 50 stalls and tea etc. £5,664 for the movement. Ayrton was with the delegation that went with Emily Pankhurst to see the Prime Minister and met his private secretary instead on 18 November 1910 (Black Friday). Ayrton permitted Christabel Pankhurst to transfer sums to her bank account to avoid confiscation in 1912, and hosted Pankhurst in times of recovery from imprisonment and force feeding. One attempt to re-arrest Pankhurst on 29 April 1913 to continue her sentence was driven back by suffragettes picketing outside, but Pankhurst was eventually re-arrested outside Ayrton's home on her way to the funeral of Emily Davison (who was killed after running in front of the King's horse at the Derby).

Ayrton was a close friend of the scientist Marie Curie and gave her daughter, Irène Curie, mathematics lessons. Although Curie usually chose to withhold her name from petitions, Ayrton managed to persuade her to sign a protest against the imprisonment of suffragettes through her daughter.

It was through suffrage activism that she met Barbara Bodichon, a fellow suffragist and a co-founder of Cambridge's Girton College. Bodichon helped to make it financially possible for Ayrton to attend Girton and went on to support her financially throughout her education and career, including bequeathing her estate to Ayrton.

Later life and research 

Ayrton delivered seven papers before the Royal Society between 1901 and 1926, the last posthumously.

She also presented the results of her research before audiences at the British Association and the Physical Society. Ayrton's interest in vortices in water and air inspired the Ayrton fan, or flapper, used in the trenches in the First World War to dispel poison and foul gas. Ayrton fought for its acceptance which took a year from her offering it to the War Office to being used in the forces in 1916, and organised its production, over 100,000 being used on the Western Front.

Ayrton helped found the International Federation of University Women in 1919 and the National Union of Scientific Workers in 1920. 

She died of blood poisoning (resulting from an insect bite) on 26 August 1923 at New Cottage, North Lancing, Sussex.

Personal life 

Hertha Ayrton was agnostic. In her teens she adopted the name "Hertha" after the eponymous heroine of a poem by Algernon Charles Swinburne that criticised organised religion.

In 1885, Ayrton married the widower William Edward Ayrton, a physicist and electrical engineer who was supportive of her scientific endeavours. Ayrton honoured Barbara Bodichon by naming her first child, a daughter born in 1886, Barbara Bodichon Ayrton (1886–1950). The daughter was called "Barbie", and she later became a member of Parliament for the Labour Party. Her daughter's son was the artist Michael Ayrton.

Hertha and William Ayrton acted as guardians for artist and suffragette Ernestine Mills after the death of Mills' mother Emily "Mynie" Ernest Bell in 1893. (Her father, writer Thomas Evans Bell, had died in 1887.) They stayed close and in May 1915, Hertha Ayrton tested an 'anti-gas fan’ in Mills' back garden in Kensington. It was later adopted as a device to clear poisonous chemical gases from British frontline trenches during the First World War. The story was transmuted into a scene in the 1924 novel The Call written by Ayrton's step-daughter Edith Zangwill, daughter of William and his first wife, doctor Matilda Chaplin Ayrton).

Commemoration 
 Two years after her death in 1923, Ayrton's lifelong friend Ottilie Hancock endowed the Hertha Ayrton Research Fellowship at Girton College. This fellowship continues today.
 A blue plaque unveiled in 2007 commemorates Ayrton at 41 Norfolk Square in Paddington.
 In 2009, the Panasonic Trust inaugurated the Hertha Marks Ayrton Fellowship to mark the trust's 25th anniversary. Its purpose is to promote the further education of under-represented groups in the engineering profession by supporting a suitably qualified engineer to study a full-time master's degree course specifically related to sustainable development or some other environmental technology.
 In 2010, a panel of female Fellows of the Royal Society and science historians selected Ayrton as voted one of the ten most influential British women in the history of science.
 In 2015, the British Society for the History of Science created the Ayrton Prize for web projects and digital engagement in history of science. It awarded the inaugural prize to Voices of Science, a project of the British Library.
 On 28 April 2016, Google commemorated Ayrton's 162nd birthday with a Google Doodle on its homepage.
 In  2016 the Council of the University of Cambridge approved the use of Ayrton's name to mark a physical feature of the North West Cambridge Development.
 Ayrton’s paper on ‘The Origin and Growth of Ripple Marks’ inspired a tapestry by Artist in Residence at Girton College 2016-2017, Yelena Popova ‘Ripple-Marked Radiance’.
 In 2017 Sheffield Hallam University named their new STEM centre after Ayrton.
In February 2018, a Blue Plaque was unveiled in Ayrton's honour on Queen Street, Portsmouth. The city also boasts a street named after her on The Hard, in postcode PO1 3DS.
In September 2019, The UK government launched the Hertha Ayrton Fund (up to £1 billion of aid funding) to give developing countries access to the latest cutting-edge technology to help reduce their emissions and meet global climate change targets.
 In September 2021 a recently extended berth at Portsmouth International Port (UK) was given the ceremonial name of 'The Ayrton Berth'.

Hertha Ayrton Research Fellowship recipients 
Recipients of the fellowship include geologist Dorothy Helen Rayer (1936-1938)

See also 
Timeline of women in science

References

Further reading 

 Reminiscences of Hertha Ayrton by A. P. Trotter in CWP at UCLA
 
 Joan Mason (2006) "Hertha Ayrton" in OUT OF THE SHADOWS: Contributions of 20th Century Women to Physics Nina Byers and Gary Williams, ed., Cambridge University Press.
 
 Hertha Ayrton, 1854-1923, A Memoir by Evelyn Sharp,  Edward Arnold & Co., 1 January 1926

External links 

 Hertha Marks Ayrton in CWP at UCLA
 Science in the Making Hertha Ayrton's papers in the Royal Society's archives
 Digital copy of the Electric Arc (1902)
 Project Continua: Biography of Hertha Ayrton Project Continua is a web-based multimedia resource dedicated to the creation and preservation of women's intellectual history from the earliest surviving evidence into the 21st Century.
 In a time of depression and isolation, Curie is rescued by a friend,  English scientist Hertha Ayrton
 
https://womenyoushouldknow.net/engineer-mathematician-physicist-inventor-hertha-marks-ayrton/

1854 births
1923 deaths
19th-century British engineers
19th-century British scientists
19th-century British women scientists
20th-century British engineers
20th-century British scientists
19th-century women engineers
20th-century women engineers
Alumni of University of London Worldwide
Alumni of the University of London
Alumni of Girton College, Cambridge
Hertha
British people of Polish-Jewish descent
British women engineers
British women mathematicians
English agnostics
English electrical engineers
English engineers
English inventors
English mathematicians
Jewish scientists
People from Portsea, Portsmouth
Women inventors
Women's Social and Political Union